"Touch Your Toes" is the first single from producer/DJ Armand Van Helden's seventh studio album, Ghettoblaster. It features Fat Joe and BL.

Track listing
Australian CD single
"Touch Your Toes" (Clean Radio Edit) – 3:07
"Touch Your Toes" (Dirty Radio Edit) – 3:13
"Touch Your Toes" (Original 12") – 5:36
"Touch Your Toes" (Lost Daze 12") – 6:45
"Touch Your Toes" (Stretch Armstrong 12") – 5:51
"Touch Your Toes" (Serge Santiago 12") – 6:47
"Touch Your Toes" (Audio Booty's 12") – 7:45

Charts

References

2007 singles
2007 songs
Armand Van Helden songs
Songs written by Armand Van Helden
Songs written by Fat Joe